The 1999–2000 Missouri Tigers men's basketball team represented the University of Missouri during the 1999–2000 NCAA men's college basketball season.

Roster

Schedule

References

Missouri Tigers men's basketball seasons
Missouri
Missouri
1999 in sports in Missouri
Tiger